Jorge Fernández Maldonado Solari (May 29, 1922 – November 10, 2000) was a Peruvian soldier and politician. He was Prime Minister of Peru (January–July 1976). He was a member of the Senate of Peru (1985–1990). He served as minister of economy and finance and energy and mines (1969–1975) in the Government of Peru. He was a recipient of the Order of May.

References 
 Biografía en el Ejército

1922 births
2000 deaths
Peruvian soldiers
Prime Ministers of Peru
Members of the Senate of Peru
Peruvian Ministers of Economy and Finance
Peruvian Ministers of Energy and Mines
Defense ministers of Peru